This article lists the complete poetic bibliography of Walt Whitman (1819-1892), predominantly consisting of his poetry collection Leaves of Grass,  in addition to periodical pieces that were never published in the aforementioned volume.

List

Notes 

 1.[To U. S. G. return’d from his World's Tour]
 2.[Written in Platte Canyon, Colorado]

References 

Lists of poems
Poetry by Walt Whitman